Pingzhi Fan is an electrical engineer at Southwest Jiaotong University in Chengdu, China. He was named a Fellow of the Institute of Electrical and Electronics Engineers (IEEE) in 2015 for his contributions to signal design in wireless communications.

References 

Fellow Members of the IEEE
Living people
Academic staff of the Southwest Jiaotong University
Chinese engineers
Year of birth missing (living people)